The Ackerman-Smith House is a historic house located in Saddle River, Bergen County, New Jersey, United States, built in 1760. It was added to the National Register of Historic Places on August 29, 1986.

Construction
The wood-frame building was originally constructed as a single room in 1760. A later addition doubled its size. The house is now a four-bay unit with a gabled roof. Western wings, porch and dormers were also added.

See also
National Register of Historic Places listings in Bergen County, New Jersey

References

Houses on the National Register of Historic Places in New Jersey
Houses completed in 1760
Houses in Bergen County, New Jersey
National Register of Historic Places in Bergen County, New Jersey
Saddle River, New Jersey
1760 establishments in New Jersey
New Jersey Register of Historic Places